Public Prosecutor General or Prosecutor General may refer to:
 Prosecutors General of Azerbaijan
 Prosecutor General (Albania)
 Prosecutor General of Armenia
 Prosecutor General of the Republic (Brazil)
 Prosecutor General of Finland
 Procureur général (France)
 Public Prosecutor General (Germany)
 Prosecutor-General of Iran
 Public Prosecutor General (Poland)
 Prosecutor-General of Russia
 Prosecutor General of South Korea
 Prosecutor-General of Sweden
 Prosecutor General of Turkmenistan
 Prosecutor General of Ukraine

See also 
 Attorney general
 Procurator General (disambiguation)
 Parquet (legal), the office of the prosecution in some countries